Daryl Hall & John Oates is the fourth studio album by American pop music duo Hall & Oates. The album was released on August 18, 1975, by RCA Records. It is sometimes referred to as The Silver Album because of its metallic cover. The album spawned three singles: "Camellia", "Alone Too Long" and "Sara Smile". "Sara Smile" peaked at number four on the Billboard Hot 100, becoming the duo's first top 40 and first top ten hit.

Background
"Grounds for Separation", according to Daryl Hall, was going to be used in the Sylvester Stallone film Rocky. Frank Stallone, Sylvester's brother, had been in a band with John Oates called Valentine and this connection got them a shot at an appearance on the soundtrack. The film, however, was slow to get off the ground, and Hall and Oates withdrew the song. "Gino (The Manager)" is about Tommy Mottola, who was the duo's manager at the time. The record jacket insert reads "And introducing Tommy Mottola as 'Little Gino.' "

Album cover
The album's cover shows an androgynous-looking Hall and Oates, both wearing makeup, against a silver background. It was designed by Pierre LaRoche, a makeup artist who was responsible for much of the androgynous look of glam rock artists at the time, including creating the appearance of the Ziggy Stardust persona for David Bowie. The cover came about after Hall and Oates happened to meet LaRoche, who like the two was living in New York City's Greenwich Village at the time; LaRoche told the two, "I want to do an album cover with you guys. I will immortalize you!"

In a 2019 interview, Oates said that the cover had confused listeners, because it seemed unrelated to either Hall & Oates' musical style or their public persona. However, he noted that it was in keeping with other androgynous-looking album covers of the time, including The Rolling Stones' Goats Head Soup and Rick Derringer's Spring Fever. He also noted that it was "pretty much the only album cover [of theirs] that anyone ever talks about, so in a way, if you just look at it in a purely analytical way, I guess it was very successful." In an interview for VH1's Behind the Music, Hall joked that the cover made him look like "the girl I always wanted to go out with".

Re-releases
In 2000, Buddah Records re-released the album with two bonus tracks ("What's Important to Me" and "Ice").

In 2009, Sony Music Custom Marketing Group released a triple pack of Hall & Oates albums, consisting of this album, H2O and Ooh Yeah!.

Track listing

Personnel 
 Daryl Hall – lead vocals (2, 4-10, 11), backing vocals, electric piano
 John Oates – backing vocals, lead vocals (1, 3, 10, 12), guitars
 Christopher Bond – synthesizers, Hammond organ, guitars, horn and string arrangements, backing vocals
 Clarence McDonald – grand piano (2)
 Scott Edwards – bass
 Leland Sklar – bass
 Jim Gordon – drums
 Ed Greene – drums
 Mike Baird – drums (9)
 Gary Coleman – percussion
 Sara Allen – backing vocals (7)

Production 
 Produced by Christopher Bond, Daryl Hall and John Oates.
 Engineered by Barry Rudolph
 Strings and horns engineered by Armin Steiner
 Recorded at Larrabee Sound Studios (North Hollywood, CA) and Western Sound Recorders (Los Angeles, CA).
 Mixed by Christopher Bond and Barry Rudolph at Sound Labs (Hollywood, CA).
 Mastered by Allen Zentz at Allen Zentz Mastering (San Clemente, CA).
 A&R Coordination – Margie Meoli
 Make-up and Cover Concept – Pierre LaRoche
 Photography – Bill King

2000 Reissue
 Producers – Jeremy Holiday and Rob Santos
 Editing and Mixing – Dennis Ferrante
 Mastering – Elliott Federman
 Digital Transfers Technician – Bob Harty

References

1975 albums
Hall & Oates albums
RCA Records albums